Blosnavirus is a genus of viruses, in the family Birnaviridae. Blotched snakehead fish serve as natural hosts. There are two species in this genus.

Taxonomy
The genus contains the following species:
 Blotched snakehead virus
 Lates calcarifer birnavirus

Structure
Viruses in Blosnavirus are non-enveloped, with icosahedral and  Single-shelled geometries, and T=13 symmetry. The diameter is around 70 nm. Genomes are linear and have 2 segments, around 2.7-3.4kb in length. The genome codes for 6 proteins.

Life cycle
Viral replication is cytoplasmic. Entry into the host cell is achieved by penetration into the host cell. Replication follows the double-stranded RNA virus replication model. Double-stranded RNA virus transcription is the method of transcription. Blotched snakehead fish serve as the natural host.

References

External links
 ICTV Report: Birnaviridae
 Viralzone: Blosnavirus

Birnaviridae
Virus genera